Dasycnemia depressalis is a species of snout moth in the genus Dasycnemia. It was described by Ragonot in 1891, and is known from Peru.

References

Moths described in 1891
Chrysauginae